A cortado is a beverage consisting of espresso mixed with a roughly equal amount of warm milk to reduce the acidity. The milk in a cortado is steamed, but not frothy and "texturized" as in many Italian coffee drinks. The cortado comes from Spain, most likely Madrid, where it is commonly served.

The word cortado is the past participle of the Spanish verb  (to cut), in the sense of "dilute", and can refer variously to either coffee or espresso drinks throughout Spanish and Portuguese speaking countries.

Cortado is made by combining a single or double shot of espresso with a small amount of steamed milk, usually in a 1:1 ratio. So essentially, it has less milk than other popular espresso drinks like Cappuccino and Latte.

Similar drinks
In Spain a café solo corto is a small amount of black coffee (usually a single shot of espresso), while a café cortado is an espresso with a splash of milk, while the term cortado is itself broadly associated with various coffee or espresso beverages having been "cut" with milk. The café cortado may in fact be interchangeable with the Italian macchiato or similar to the French noisette. 

The cortadito in Cuba specifically implies a small beverage similar to the café solo corto consisting of a standard  espresso shot; however, unlike the solo corto, the Cuban cortadito is generally cut with heated sweetened condensed milk, being a more available preserved form of milk, whereas fresh milk was historically often unavailable. A cortadito is usually served in a special glass, often with a metal ring base and a metal wire handle. There are several nominal variations, including cortado condensada, café con leche condensada or bombón (espresso with condensed milk); leche y leche is a similar variation, but with both condensed milk integrated throughout and a dollop of cream resting on top. Brought to the Little Havana neighborhood of Miami, Florida, by Cuban-Americans in the 1960s, the cortadito drink is now found throughout the city, and is an important part of everyday culture, particularly among Cubans. However, the cortadito is a drink distinct from Cuban-style coffee, which includes sugar in addition to milk, and has its own brewing method as espresso.

In non Spanish-speaking countries where it appears on a specialty coffee menu, however, the cortado should generally be distinguished from the Italian caffè macchiato, cappuccino, or a flat white. A macchiato has only a small amount (a 'mark' or spot) of milk foam added, while a cappuccino has a head from both foam and milk. A flat white is generally made with a similar equivalent ratio of espresso to milk, but uses steamed and textured (e.g. microfoam) milk, resulting in a hotter and lighter drink, more closely related to a caffè latte.

A similar drink in Australia is known as a piccolo latte, or simply a piccolo. This is a single ristretto shot in a macchiato glass that is filled with steamed milk in the same fashion as a cafe latte. A larger drink, popular in Portugal, is the galão, which uses 1:3 proportions but is otherwise similar to both cortados and manchados.

Other names and variations
In Catalan, tallat takes the role of describing being cut, with the closest word in Basque being ebaki, and pingado or garoto in Portuguese. In the United States the meaning of the name can vary by region but on the East Coast it is generally known as a cortado. In the Czech Republic, Costa Coffee sells cortado under the marketing name corto classic.

Gibraltar

The name gibraltar originated in San Francisco, California, where roasters – first Blue Bottle Coffee Company, later Ritual Coffee Roasters and others – started the cortado trend by serving the drink in Libbey Glass Company glassware by the same name. Whereas a cortado is a broader term for many a cut beverage, a gibraltar is specifically defined in its proportions by the constraints of its cup size: a Libbey "Gibraltar" glass contains ,  of which are filled by a standard double espresso shot and the remainder filled by foamy steamed milk. While some sources assert there is no distinction between a gibraltar and a cortado, establishments that offer both drinks generally differentiate the gibraltar with a richer, more velvety texture and a cooler, lukewarm temperature.

See also

List of coffee drinks

References

External links

Coffee drinks